This is a list of player transfers involving Top 14 teams before or during the 2017–18 season. The list is of deals that are confirmed and are either from or to a rugby union team in the Top 14 during the 2016–17 season.  On 20 May 2017, Oyonnax and Agen are promoted in to the Top 14 for the 2017–18 season, with Bayonne and Grenoble demoted to the Pro D2 It is not unknown for confirmed deals to be cancelled at a later date.

Agen

Players In
 Loris Tolot from  Montauban
 Vilikisa Salawa from  Mont-de-Marsan
 Morgan Phelipponneau from  Vannes
 Facundo Bosch from  Jaguares
 Leandro Cedaro from  La Rochelle
 Mickael de Marco from  Oyonnax
 Vincent Farre from  Albi
 Lucas Rubio from  Narbonne
 Ignacio Mieres from  Dax
 Yoan Tanga from  Castres
 Gagi Bazadze from  Montpellier
 Ricky Januarie from  La Rochelle
 Nicholas Metge from  Oyonnax
 Loick Jammes from  Grenoble
 Paul Ngauamo from  Mont-de-Marsan
 Akapusi Qera from  Montpellier
 Sam Vaka from  Counties Manukau
 Jake McIntyre from  Queensland Reds
 Opeti Fonua from  Newcastle Falcons

Players Out
 Taylor Paris to  Castres
 Mike Tadjer to  Brive
 Nathan Decron to  Bordeaux
 Florian Dufour to  Bordeaux
 William Demotte to  La Rochelle
 Burton Francis to  Grenoble
 Remi Vaquin retired
 Francois Bouvier to  Carcassonne
 Dan Hollinshead to  Coca-Cola West Red Sparks
 Clement Darbo to  Montauban
 Sione Tau to  Perpignan
 Francois Tardieu to  Colomiers
 Arsene N'Nomo to  Marmande
 Marc Baget to  Orthez

Bordeaux

Players In
 Apisai Naqavelu from  Dax
 Adrien Pélissié from  Aurillac
 Nathan Decron from  Agen
 Florian Dufour from  Agen
 Alexandre Roumat from  Biarritz
 Cameron Woki from  Massy
 Tian Schoeman from  Bulls
 Adrien Vigne from  Béziers
 Peni Ravai from  Aurillac
 Mahamadou Diaby from  Grenoble
 Pierre Gayraud from  Bayonne
 Leroy Houston from  Queensland Reds
 Fa'asiu Fuatai from  Otago
 Jean-Pascal Barraque from  France Sevens
 Ben Volavola from  Melbourne Rebels
 Ed Fidow from  Queensland Country

Players Out
 Ronan Chambord to  Biarritz
 Jean-Marcelin Buttin to  Lyon
 Louis-Benoit Madaule to  Toulouse
 Jean-Baptiste Poux retired
 Lionel Beauxis to  Lyon
 Joe Vakacegu to  Biarritz
 Julien Audy to  Oyonnax
 Adam Ashley-Cooper to  Kobelco Steelers
 Berend Botha to  Perpignan
 Ian Madigan to  Bristol
 Steven Kitshoff to  Stormers
 Peter Saili to  Pau
 Joe Edwards to  Provence
 Benat Auzqui to  Grenoble

Brive

Players In
 Etienne Harjean from  Narbonne
 Damien Lagrange from  La Rochelle
 Franck Romanet from  Lyon
 Mike Tadjer from  Agen
 Samuel Marques from  Toulouse
 Florian Cazenave from  Rugby Reggio
 Sila Puafisi from  Glasgow Warriors
 James Johnston from  Worcester Warriors
 Felix Le Bourhis from  Bayonne
 Na'ama Leleimalefaga from  Worcester Warriors
 Julien Brugnaut from  Racing 92

Players Out
 Jean-Baptiste Pejoine retired
 Arnaud Mela retired
 Teddy Iribaren to  Racing 92
 Guillaume Ribes retired
 Lucas Pointud to  Toulouse
 Chris Tuatara-Morrison to  Colomiers
 Romain Cabannes to  Mont-de-Marsan
 Patrick Toetu to  Albi
 William Whetton to  Albi
 Damien Lavergne to  Soyaux Angoulême
 Kevin Buys to  Oyonnax
 Malakai Radikedike to  Bourgoin

Castres

Players In
 Taylor Paris from  Agen
 Ludovic Radosavljevic from  Clermont Auvergne
 Armand Batlle from  Grenoble
 Yohan Le Bourhis from  Biarritz
 Kevin Firmin from  Dax
 Yohan Domenech from  Carcassonne

Players Out
 Remy Grosso to  Clermont Auvergne
 Antoine Dupont to  Toulouse
 Brice Mach to  Perpignan
 Julien Seron to  Carcassonne
 Francois Fontaine to  Colomiers
 Horacio Agulla to  Hindu Club
 Yoan Tanga to  Agen
 Julien Grolleau to  Lavaur

Clermont

Players In
 Greig Laidlaw from  Gloucester
 Remy Grosso from  Castres
 Loni Uhila from  Hurricanes
 Rabah Slimani from  Stade Français
 Peter Betham from  Leicester Tigers

Players Out
 Clement Ric to  Lyon
 Thomas Domingo to  Pau
 Julien Bardy to  Montpellier
 Ludovic Radosavljevic to  Castres
 Enzo Sanga to  Montpellier
 Vincent Debaty to  Oyonnax
 Benson Stanley to  Pau
 Pierre Rude to  Aurillac
 Adrien Plante to  Pau

La Rochelle

Players In
 Geoffrey Doumayrou from  Stade Français
 Jeremy Sinzelle from  Stade Français
 Jean-Charles Orioli from  Toulon
 Gregory Lamboley from  Toulouse
 William Demotte from  Agen
 Thomas Jolmes from  Grenoble
 Greg Alldritt from  Auch
 Pierre Bourgarit from  Auch
 Tawera Kerr-Barlow from  Chiefs
 Ryan Lamb from  Worcester Warriors
 Rene Ranger from  Blues

Players Out
 Damien Lagrange to  Brive
 Zack Holmes to  Toulouse
 Leandro Cedaro to  Agen
 Anthony Fuertes to  Oyonnax
 Pierre Popelin to  Carcassonne
 Jordan Seneca to  Nevers
 Jules Le Bail to  Vannes
 Charles Lagarde to  Vannes
 Piere Popelin to  France Sevens
 Ricky Januarie to  Agen
 Savenaca Rawaca to  Bayonne
 Maxime Gau to  Stade Français
 David Raikuna to  Strasbourg

Lyon

Players In
 Jean-Marcelin Buttin from  Bordeaux
 Virgile Lacombe from  Racing 92
 Theophile Cotte from  Bourgoin
 Clement Ric from  Clermont Auvergne
 Piero Dominguez from  Pakuranga
 Lionel Beauxis from  Bordeaux
 Xavier Mignot from  Grenoble
 Maxime Granouillet from  Aurillac
 Francois van der Merwe from  Racing 92
 Etienne Oosthuizen from  Sharks
 Richard Choirat from  Bayonne
 Jonathan Pelissie from  Toulon
 Hendrik Roodt from  Grenoble
 Timilai Rokoduru from  Albi
 Alexis Palisson from  Toulouse
 Liam Gill from  Toulon

Players Out
 Thibaut Privat retired
 Julien Bonnaire retired
 Franck Romanet to  Brive
 Jacques-Louis Potgieter to  Perpignan
 Nisie Huyard to  Mont-de-Marsan
 Maselino Paulino to  Narbonne
 Sami Mavinga to  Newcastle Falcons
 Romain Loursac retired
 Guillaume Galletier to  Montpellier
 Nicolas Durand retired
 Dider Tison to  Carcassonne
 Cameron Njewel to  Oyonnax
 Curtis Browning to  Oyonnax
 Ti'i Paulo to  Tasman
 Zaza Navrozashvili to  Albi
 Paul Bonneford to  France Sevens
 Napolioni Nalaga to  London Irish
 BJ Botha to  Biarritz

Montpellier

Players In
 Yacouba Camara from  Toulouse
 Julien Bardy from  Clermont Auvergne
 Enzo Sanga from  Clermont Auvergne
 Aaron Cruden from  Chiefs
 Kevin Kornath from  Grenoble
 Guillaume Galletier from  Lyon
 Jan Serfontein from  Bulls
 Louis Picamoles from  Northampton Saints
 Ruan Pienaar from  Ulster
 Levan Chilachava from  Toulon

Players Out
 Demetri Catrakilis to  Harlequins
 Mickael Romera to  Oyonnax
 Nic White to  Exeter Chiefs
 Duhan van der Merwe to  Edinburgh
 Ben Botica to  Oyonnax
 Cameron Wright to  Sharks
 Gagi Bazadze to  Agen
 Akapusi Qera to  Agen
 Pierre Spies retired
 Marvin O'Connor to  Stade Français
 Robins Tchale-Watchou retired
 Tomás O'Leary retired
 Julien Malzieu retired
 Antoine Battut released
 Davit Kubriashvili  to  Grenoble

Oyonnax

Players In
 Julien Audy from  Bordeaux
 Tim Giresse from  Biarritz
 Vincent Debaty from  Clermont Auvergne
 Phoenix Battye from  Béziers
 Mickael Romera from  Montpellier
 Anthony Fuertes from  La Rochelle
 Matt Hopper from  Harlequins
 Cameron Njewel from  Lyon
 Curtis Browning from  Lyon
 Pietro Ceccarelli from  Zebre
 Hika Elliot from  Chiefs
 Ben Botica from  Montpellier
 Rory Grice from  Grenoble
 Khatchik Vartanov from  Racing 92
 Kevin Buys from  Brive
 Mitch Inman from  Melbourne Rebels

Players Out
 Fabien Cibray to  Provence
 Mickael de Marco to  Agen
 Uwa Tawalo to  Biarritz
 Nuku Swirling to  Grenoble
 Jamie Cudmore retired
 Thomas Bordes to  Massy
 Pascal Cotet to  Aubenas
 Arthur Aziza to  Narbonne
 Keziah Giordano to  Provence
 Nicholas Metge to  Agen
 Alaska Taufa to  Grenoble
 Killian Marie to  Limoges
 Lucas Chouvet to  Valence Romans Drome
 Fetu'u Vainikolo to  Valence Romans Drome
 Lukas Rapant to  Bellegarde
 Eamonn Sheridan to  Carcassonne

Pau

Players In
 Thomas Domingo from  Clermont Auvergne
 Martin Puech from  Colomiers
 Laurent Bouchet from  Grenoble
 Florian Nicot from  Colomiers
 Benson Stanley from  Clermont Auvergne
 Frank Halai from  Wasps
 Dave Foley from  Munster
 Peter Saili from  Bordeaux
 Lourens Adriaanse from  Sharks
 Adrien Plante from  Clermont Auvergne

Players Out
 Mehdi Boundjema to  Narbonne
 Louis Dupichot to  Racing 92
 Julien Jacquot to  Morlaas
 James Coughlan retired
 Santiago Fernandez to  Hindu Club
 Mosese Ratuvou to  Chambéry
 Ibrahim Diarra to  Lavaur
 Loïc Bernad to  Tarbes

Racing 92

Players In
 Teddy Iribaren from  Brive
 Census Johnston from  Toulouse
 Vasil Kakovin from  Toulouse
 Louis Dupichot from  Pau
 Donnacha Ryan from  Munster
 Baptiste Chouzenoux from  Bayonne
 Virimi Vakatawa from  France Sevens
 Patricio Albacete from  Toulouse
 Edwin Maka from  Toulouse
 Pat Lambie from  Sharks

Players Out
 Virgile Lacombe to  Lyon
 Pierre Maiau to  Grenoble
 Étienne Dussartre to  Grenoble
 James Hart to  Munster
 Loïc Godener to  Grenoble
 Mathieu Loree to  Mont-de-Marsan
 Thibault Dubarry to  Biarritz
 Julien Brugnaut to  Brive
 Francois van der Merwe to  Lyon
 Chris Masoe retired
 Sean Robinson to  Bayonne
 Khatchik Vartanov to  Oyonnax
 Gerbrandt Grobler to  Munster

Stade Français

Players In
 Jimmy Yobo from  Toulon
 Bakery Meite from  Béziers
 Charl McLeod from  Grenoble
 Terry Bouhraoua from  France Sevens
 Marvin O'Connor from  Montpellier
 Romain Martial from  Bayonne
 Lorenzo Cittadini from  Bayonne
 Tony Ensor from  Otago
 Ramiro Herrera from  Jaguares
 Maxime Gau from  La Rochelle
 Corne Fourie from  Lions
 Shane Geraghty from  Bristol
 Gurthro Steenkamp from  Toulouse

Players Out
 Pascal Papé retired
 Raphaël Lakafia to  Toulon
 Geoffrey Doumayrou to  La Rochelle
 Hugo Bonneval to  Toulon
 Jeremy Sinzelle to  La Rochelle
 Rabah Slimani to  Clermont Auvergne
 Jono Ross to  Sale Sharks
 Julien Dupuy retired
 Will Genia to  Melbourne Rebels
 Entienne Swanepoel to  Southern Kings
 Zurab Zhvanial to  Wasps

Toulon

Players In
 Chris Ashton from  Saracens
 Raphaël Lakafia from  Stade Français
 Hugo Bonneval from  Stade Français
 Semi Radradra from  Parramatta Eels
 Jonathan Wisniewski from  Grenoble
 Facundo Isa from  Jaguares
 Luke McAlister from  Toulouse
 Jean Monribot from  Bayonne
 JP Pietersen from  Leicester Tigers
 Edoardo Padovani from  Zebre
 Jonah Placid from  Melbourne Rebels
 Malakai Fekitoa from  Highlanders
 Alby Mathewson from  Bristol

Players Out
 Jean-Charles Orioli to  La Rochelle
 Jimmy Yobo to  Stade Français
 Maxime Mermoz to  Newcastle Falcons
 Teiva Jacquelain to  Grenoble
 Drew Mitchell retired
 Jonathan Pelissie to  Lyon
 Matt Giteau to  Suntory Sungoliath
 Ben Barba to  St Helens
 Pierre Bernard to  Biarritz
 Manasa Saulo to  London Irish
 Juan Smith to  Toyota Verblitz
 Ayumu Goromaru to  Yamaha Júbilo
 Aidon Davis to  Bayonne
 James O'Connor to  Sale Sharks
 Liam Gill to  Lyon
 Shalva Mamukashvili to  Carcassonne
 Leigh Halfpenny to  Scarlets
 Levan Chilachava to  Montpellier

Toulouse

Players In
 Louis-Benoit Madaule from  Bordeaux
 Antoine Dupont from  Castres
 Zack Holmes from  La Rochelle
 Charlie Faumuina from  Blues
 Lucas Pointud from  Brive
 Cheslin Kolbe from  Stormers
 Baptiste Mouchous from  Tarbes
 Danie Mienie from  Cheetahs
 Wandile Mjekevu from  Southern Kings

Players Out
 Christopher Tolofua to  Saracens
 Yacouba Camara to  Montpellier
 Census Johnston to  Racing 92
 Samuel Marques to  Brive
 Vasil Kakovin to  Racing 92
 Gregory Lamboley to  La Rochelle
 Thierry Dusautoir retired
 Luke McAlister to  Toulon
 Toby Flood to  Newcastle Falcons
 Alexis Palisson to  Lyon
 Patricio Albacete to  Racing 92
 Edwin Maka to  Racing 92
 Gurthro Steenkamp to  Stade Français

See also
List of 2017–18 Premiership Rugby transfers
List of 2017–18 Pro14 transfers
List of 2017–18 Super Rugby transfers
List of 2017–18 RFU Championship transfers

References

2017-18
2017–18 Top 14 season